Michael Mühlebach Christiansen better known by his stage name Jøden (born 7 August 1974 in Skanderborg, Denmark) is a Danish rapper signed to the ArtPeople label.

Mühlebach Christiansen was born in Skanderborg but grew up in Aarhus. Born in a Catholic family, but was dubbed Jøden (literally The Jew). He released his debut album Monkeyjuice that was produced by DJ Static and charted in Denmark, reaching number 12. The debut single was "Hamrer Løs" with guest vocalist Peter Sommer.

Jøden was also part of Pimp-A-Lot that included Danish-Palestinian rapper Marwan (full name Mohamed Marwan). He also hosted a number of MC's Fight Night rap events in 2006, 2007 and 2008.

In 2011, he started cooperating with Jonny Hefty (real name Jakob Øroms) and had good success with a joint single in May 2011 "Gamle dreng" as well as some other tracks, eventually releasing a joint album in 2013, titled Den fede that has also charted in Denmark.

In popular culture
In 2010, he appeared in TV 2 Zulu's Zulu Kvæg-ræs.
The same year he hosted the live show UPS! Det er live. 
In 2012, he appeared in TV 2 Zulu show Tåber på eventyr and co-hosted with Karsten Green another season of UPS! Det er live.

Discography

Albums
Solo

as Jonny Hefty & Jøden

Singles

References

Danish rappers
1974 births
Living people
People from Skanderborg Municipality